Bikram Pandey is a Nepalese politician belonging to Rastriya Prajatantra Party and constituent assembly member. He was elected to the Pratinidhi Sabha in the 2013 CA election on behalf of the Rastriya Prajatantra Party from Chitwan 5.

Pandey is the current Vice president of Rastriya Prajatantra Party elected from the 2021 general convention of Rastriya Prajatantra Party.

Political life 
Pandey has served several terms as minister in different ministries. Pandey was one among the three RPP leaders to win FPTP election to Constituent Assembly after 2013.

In 2017 Nepalese General Election, Pandey was candidate from Chitwan 3 against former prime minister and Maoist leader Pushpa Kamal Dahal. He had challenged Dahal to win the constituency on his own while this was keenly watched throughout the country. Pandey, a candidate of RPP was supported by Nepali Congress. Though Pandey was unsuccessful, he lost with a very less margin than expected.

Pandey is the newly elected Vice president of the Rastriya Prajatantra Party.

Controversies 
Pandey is the chairman of Kalika Group which operates construction and power companies, among others. In 2018, the Commission for the Investigation of Abuse of Authority filed Rs 2 billion corruption case against Pandey over the faulty construction of the Sikta Irrigation Canal. Pandey was later acquitted of all charges by the Special Court.

Pandey's appointment as Minister for Urban Development in 2023 has also been criticized as a conflict of interest since he owns a construction company that bids for government tenders and is now in charge of a ministry that hands out those same tenders.

Electoral history

2017 legislative elections

References

Living people
Rastriya Prajatantra Party politicians
Members of the 2nd Nepalese Constituent Assembly
People from Chitwan District
Nepal MPs 2022–present
1953 births